Dampiera diversifolia is a subshrub in the family Goodeniaceae from the southwest of Western Australia.

References

diversifolia
Endemic flora of Western Australia
Plants described in 1845
Taxa named by Willem Hendrik de Vriese